Warmen is a Finnish heavy metal band assembled by keyboardist Janne "Warman" Wirman. Wirman has played with Children of Bodom from 1997 until their disbandment in 2019, and in 2000 created a musical project focused on instrumental work, which would only have guest singers on a few selected songs.

Albums

Unknown Soldier (1999–2001)
The first incarnation of Warmen was composed of Janne, guitarist Sami Virtanen and drummer Mirka Rantanen. This line-up successfully recorded and released the Unknown Soldier album in 2000, with the collaboration of guest singer Kimberly Goss (from Sinergy), guitarist Roope Latvala (also from Sinergy, later also from Children of Bodom) and bassist Jari Kainulainen (from Stratovarius).

Beyond Abilities (2002–2004)
The following year, the band saw the addition of Lauri Porra (later in Sinergy and Stratovarius) and Janne's guitarist brother, Antti Wirman (from Kotipelto). In the Warmen Productions Studio (now called Beyond Abilities), this line-up recorded the album Beyond Abilities, a progressive metal album that received critical appraisal. With a more prominent and diverse use of vocals, this album made use of the talent of Timo Kotipelto (from Stratovarius), Pasi Nykänen (from Throne of Chaos) and returning vocalist Kimberly Goss.

Accept the Fact (2005–2006)
Their third album, Accept the Fact was released in June 2005 and features vocals by Timo Kotipelto, Marko Vaara, Jonna Kosonen and Alexi Laiho from Children of Bodom. Alexi performs clean vocals in "Somebody's Watching Me" (originally by Rockwell), which is rare, since in Children of Bodom he has performed clean vocals in only one song, a cover of "Rebel Yell", originally by Billy Idol. The spoken words on the first track "Accept the Fact" are taken from the movie Amadeus, spoken by the character Salieri.

Japanese Hospitality (2008–2010)

The fourth Warmen album, titled Japanese Hospitality, was released on August 24, 2009 via Spinefarm Records. The 10-song effort includes two cover versions — "Separate Ways", originally recorded by Journey, and "Black Cat" by Janet Jackson, featuring a guest appearance by the Finnish pop/rock singer Jonna Kosonen. Other guest musicians that appear on the CD include Alexi Laiho (Children of Bodom) and Pasi Rantanen (ex-Thunderstone).

First of the Five Elements (2014–present)

On July 9, 2014, Warmen started a campaign on PledgeMusic to have fans help fund the production of the album, titled First of the Five Elements. This campaign was successful and the album was released on that same year.

Band members
Current members
 Janne Viljami Wirman – keyboards 
 Mirka Rantanen – drums 
 Antti Wirman – guitars 
 Jyri Helko – bass guitar 

Former members
 Sami Virtanen – guitars 
 Lauri Porra – bass guitar

Timeline

Discography

Albums
 Unknown Soldier (2000)
 Beyond Abilities (2001)
 Accept the Fact (2005)
 Japanese Hospitality (2009)
 First of the Five Elements (2014)

Compilations
The Evil That Warmen Do (2010)

Singles
 Alone (2001)
 Somebody's Watching Me (2005)
 They All Blame Me (2005)

References

Finnish heavy metal musical groups
Finnish progressive metal musical groups
Finnish power metal musical groups
Musical groups established in 2000
Nuclear Blast artists